Sir William Knighton, 1st Baronet,  (1776 – 11 October 1836) was Private Secretary to the Sovereign under George IV (1822–1830).

Life

He was born in 1776 at Bere Ferrers in Devon, and studied under his uncle, Dr. Bredall, in Tavistock, Devon. He spent two years at Guy's Hospital, London, and received a diploma from the University of St Andrews in 1797. In that year he was assistant surgeon at the Royal Naval Hospital Plymouth, and then commenced private practice, initially in Devonport, in London from 1803 then briefly Edinburgh, then in London again from 1806. He was medical officer to the embassy to Spain in 1809. He retired from private practice in 1822.

Knighton studied at the University of Edinburgh for three years. He received MDs from the University of Aberdeen in 1806, from the Archbishop of Canterbury, and from the University of Göttingen in 1821.

He was physician to the Prince of Wales in 1810. He was also auditor of the Duchy of Lancaster, and from 1821 to 1830 was unofficially private secretary to the king and formally Keeper of the Privy Purse. In an almost unprecedented move, the king surrendered control of his financial affairs to Knighton in 1822, on account of his enormous debts. After three years, in 1825, Knighton declared that the king was free of debt. He had an unparalleled influence over the king, and letters from him to Knighton were addressed "M[y] D[ear] F[riend]," unlike the normal third person that was associated with the sovereign.

He was created a baronet on 1 January 1813.

He died on 11 October 1836 at Stratford Place in London. He is buried in Kensal Green Cemetery.

Family

In 1800 he married Dorothea Hawker.

References

Further reading
Aspinall, Arthur (Jan 1940). "George IV and Sir William Knighton". English Historical Review 55(267) 57–82
Frost, Charlotte (2010). Sir William Knighton. The Strange Career of a Regency Physician
Hoffbrand, B. I. (Feb 2010). "Sir William Knighton Bt MD GCH LRCP (1776-1836): courtier and confidante – testimony to physicianly virtues?". Journal of Medical Biography 18(1) 2–9
Knighton, Dorothea (1838). Memoirs of Sir William Knighton, Bart. G.C.H.  Keeper of the Privy Purse During the Reign of His Majesty King George the Fourth. Including his correspondence with many distinguished persons
Morris, W. I. C. (1976). "Sir William Knighton. The Invisible Accoucheur". Manchester Medical Gazette 55(2) 46–50

 

|-

1776 births
1836 deaths
Baronets in the Baronetage of the United Kingdom
Private Secretaries to the Sovereign
Alumni of the University of Edinburgh
Burials at Kensal Green Cemetery
George IV of the United Kingdom
19th-century English medical doctors
Medical doctors from Devon